Saint Silvinus or Silvin (c. 650 in Toulouse – 15 February 717 or 718 in Auchy) was an evangelist in the area of Thérouanne, which is now in northern France. He retired in the Benedictine abbey of Auchy-les-Moines.

His feast day is 17 February.

External links
Silvinus at Patron Saints Index
17 February saints at Saint Celtes et Belges
17 February saints at St. Patrick's Church

650 births
710s deaths
8th-century Frankish saints
French Benedictines